U&I (e.g. You and I) may refer to:

 U&I (album), by Leila, 2012
"U&I" (song), by Ailee, 2013
"U&I", a song by Jodeci from their album Forever My Lady
"Ü&I", a song by Lykke Li from her album Eyeye
U and I: A True Story, a 1991 book by Nicholson Baker
Utah-Idaho Sugar Company, an American sugar beet processing company
Upin & Ipin, a Malaysian TV Series

See also
You and I (disambiguation)